India's Raw Star is an Indian singing competition series created by Gajendra Singh of Saibaba Telefilms which began airing on Star Plus from 24 August 2014. It was hosted by model-actress and Bigg Boss 7 winner Gauahar Khan and mentored by singer-rapper Yo Yo Honey Singh. Rituraj Mohanty  won the first season on 30 November 2014 with Darshan Raval and Mohit Gaur finishing second and third respectively. The other contestants were Sagar Bhatia, Akasa Singh, pardeep singh sran etc. Mohan Rathore, winner of a Bhojpuri singing competition 'Sur Sangram' was also one of the contestants. Arjun Kapoor and Deepika Padukone made guest appearances in the show. India's Raw Star''' witnessed singers like Kailash Kher, Mohit Chauhan and Shaan perform in the final episode with finalists Rituraj, Mohit and Darshan. The finalists sang the final face off song composed by Sachin and Jigar on the occasion, while Arjun Kapoor, promoted his film Tevar''.

Winner

Darshan Raval, Mohit Gaur and Rituraj Mohanty reached at finale of India's Raw Star. Rituraj Mohanty was announced as the winner of the show.

Production
The show was filmed at sets created in the Filmcity in Goregaon at Mumbai.

References

External links
 Official Website on hotstar

2014 Indian television series debuts
StarPlus original programming
Indian reality television series
Singing talent shows
Hindi-language television shows